The Best of Babes In Toyland and Kat Bjelland is a CD/DVD compilation featuring songs by Babes in Toyland and Kat Bjelland's other projects, including her work in Crunt, Katastrophy Wife, and Pagan Babies. It was released in 2004 by WEA International in the United Kingdom.

Track listing

Notes
Tracks 2-14 performed by Babes in Toyland
Track 16 performed by Pagan Babies
Track 17 performed by The Italian Whorenuns
Track 18 performed by Crunt
Tracks 19-26 performed by Katastrophy Wife

DVD Track Listing
 Spanking Machine (Making of)
 Painkillers (Making of)
 Nemesisters (Making of)
 He's My Thing (Music Video)
 Ripe (Music Video)
 Bruise Violet (Music Video)
 Won't Tell (Music Video)
 Sweet '69 (Music Video)
 Liberty Belle (Live)
 Bonus Material (Early footage of Kat Bjelland, live performances, and Crunt music videos)

Personnel
Kat Bjelland	 - 	guitar, vocals; bass on "Unglued"
Lori Barbero	 - 	drums on Tracks 2-14
Maureen Herman	 - 	bass Tracks 5-14
Michelle Leon       -      bass on Tracks 2-4
Courtney Love       -      vocals on Track 16
Janis Tanaka        -      bass on Tracks 16 & 17
Deirdre Schletter   -      piano on Track 16, drums on Track 17
Stu Spasm          -      guitar on Track 18
Russell Simins      -     drums on Track 18
Glen Mattson        -      drums on Tracks 19-22
Darren Donovan      -    drums on Tracks 22-26
Andrew Parker       -     bass on Tracks 22-26

References

Babes in Toyland (band) compilation albums
2004 greatest hits albums
2004 video albums
Music video compilation albums
Grunge video albums